The Shannons Nationals Motor Racing Championships is a series of motor racing events held across five states of Australia. It was first held as the CAMS National Racing Championships in 2006 and adopted its present name the following year when it gained Shannons Insurance as a new partner.

The series brings a number of Australian racing categories together under one banner, allowing costs to be spread across a broad base. The four core categories represented are Australian Formula 3 (contesting the Australian Drivers' Championship), Saloon Cars (contesting the Australian Saloon Car Series), Australian Manufacturers' Championship (incorporating the Australian Production Car Championship) and Porsche GT3 Cup Challenge Australia. Other series supported are the Kerrick Sports Sedan Series, Kumho Tyres V8 Touring Car Series, Australian Superkart Championship, Formula Vee Series and Aussie Racing Cars.

The environment of the series has given some categories the opportunity to grow where opportunities might have been more limiting in higher profile events, while the pooling of resources across a number of categories has resulted in lower management costs and improved access to television recording facilities. Categories that contribute to the cost of the television coverage are screened, usually the following weekend, as part of the SBS Speedweek programme, which is broadcast initially on SBS and then repeated on Fox Sports. The Championships have also allowed several higher profile races to be established or re-established, including the Bathurst 12 Hour, the Tasmanian Super Prix, the Australian Tourist Trophy, the Clem Smith Trophy and the Pacific Superkart Challenge.

Series Champions

References

External links
 Official website

Auto racing series in Australia
Multi-sport events in Australia
Recurring sporting events established in 2006